Caldy railway station was a station on the single track Hooton to West Kirby branch of the Birkenhead Railway, on the Wirral Peninsula, England.

History
The Birkenhead Railway, owned jointly by the Great Western Railway (GWR) and London and North Western Railway (LNWR), had initially opened a branch line from Hooton to Parkgate in 1866. An extension to West Kirby was completed twenty years later although Caldy station did not open until 1 May 1909.

The station was located to the west of the village of Caldy and situated on top of a high embankment. This was due to a local landowner objecting to the original intended course of the line; which resulted in the station being much closer to the coast of the River Dee than was planned. The site consisted of a single platform on a single track section of the line. The station building was constructed from corrugated iron and consisted of a ticket office, waiting room and male & female toilets.

Closure
On 1 February 1954 the station was closed to passengers, although the line itself remained open to passenger trains for another two years. The track continued to be used for freight transportation and driver training for another eight years, closing on 7 May 1962. The line was lifted two years later with the station building and platform completely demolished.

Wirral Country Park
The route became the Wirral Way footpath and part of Wirral Country Park in 1973, which was the first such designated site in Britain.

References

Further reading

External links

Disused railway stations in the Metropolitan Borough of Wirral
Former Birkenhead Railway stations
Railway stations in Great Britain opened in 1909
Railway stations in Great Britain closed in 1954
1909 establishments in England
1954 disestablishments in England